The following is a list of notable companies and organizations that have their corporate headquarters or a major presence in the Orlando, Florida area:

Orlando companies

AAA
ABC Fine Wine & Spirits
AdventHealth
Amazon
Alinean
Aon Hewitt
AssuredPartners
Atlantic.Net
Campus Crusade for Christ
Central Florida Expressway Authority
CNL Financial Group 
CHEP
Darden Restaurants
Disney Parks, Experiences and Products
Electronic Arts
Fairwinds Credit Union
Florida's Turnpike Enterprise
FoodFirst Global Restaurants
Golf Channel
Hilton Grand Vacations Club
HostDime
Houghton Mifflin Harcourt
JetBlue
HNTB
Ligonier Ministries
Lockheed Martin
Loews Hotels
Luctor International
Lynx
Marriott International
Marriott Vacation Club International
Miller's Ale House
NBC Universal
Nemours Foundation
Oracle Corporation
Orlando Health
Pioneers
Planet Hollywood
PulteGroup
Red Lobster
Reed Elsevier
Ruth's Chris Steakhouse
Ryman Hospitality Properties
Sanford-Burnham Medical Research Institute
SAHARA Digital Agency
Scholastic Book Fairs 
SeaWorld Entertainment
Siemens Power Generation
Spectrum
StackPath
SunTrust Bank
T. G. Lee Dairy
Tijuana Flats
Trinity Broadcasting Network
Tupperware
Universal Studios
Walt Disney Company
Westgate Resorts
Wheeled Coach
Wycliffe Bible Translators
Wyndham Destinations (formerly part of Wyndham Worldwide, formerly part of Cendant)
YRC Worldwide

Orlando, Florida-related lists